Vermilyea Inn Historic District is a national historic district located near Fort Wayne in Aboite Township, Allen County, Indiana. The district encompasses one contributing building, the Jesse Vermilyea House, and three contributing structures. The house was built in 1839, and is a two-story, three bay, Federal style brick dwelling. It has an original two-story, four bay, gable roofed wing, a -story wood and brick garage addition built about 1945, and a -story brick addition built about 2000.  The other contributing resources are the visible earthworks of the Wabash and Erie Canal and the timber platform of the canal aqueduct.  Its builder, Jesse Vermilyea, opened his house as an inn and tavern and operated as such through the 19th century.

The district was listed on the National Register of Historic Places in 2005.

References

External links
The Vermilyea House
Vermilyea House State Register Nomination
Vermilyea House blueprint and site drawing
Vermilyea House site card

Houses on the National Register of Historic Places in Indiana
Historic districts on the National Register of Historic Places in Indiana
Houses completed in 1839
Federal architecture in Indiana
Houses in Allen County, Indiana
National Register of Historic Places in Allen County, Indiana